Bojan Gojak (born 28 August 1979) is a Serbian former football defender.

References

External links
 
 Bojan Gojak Stats at utakmica.rs

1979 births
Living people
People from Prijepolje
Association football defenders
Serbian footballers
FK Metalac Gornji Milanovac players
Serbian SuperLiga players
Serbian expatriate footballers
Expatriate footballers in North Macedonia
FK Sloga Jugomagnat players